Notable alumni of St. John's University in New York City include, alphabetically:

 Peter Abbate, member of New York State Assembly
 Joseph P. Addabbo (1925–1986), US Representative from New York (1961–1986)
 Joseph Addabbo, Jr., New York State Senator and New York City Council member
 Haron Amin (born 1979), Afghan diplomat and spokesman for Northern Alliance after September 11 attacks
 Rich Aurilia (born 1971), Major League Baseball player
 James Baba, Ugandan diplomat, politician, and state minister
 Michael Balboni, NY Deputy Secretary of State for Public Safety, NYS Senator
 Leszek Balcerowicz, MBA (1974), senior government official and architect of the Balcerowicz Plan leading Poland into a market economy
 Russ Banham (born 1954), Pulitzer Prize-nominated journalist and best-selling author
 Morton Bard, psychologist, trailblazer in crisis intervention, author of The Crime Victim's Book
 Erick Barkley, NBA player selected in first round of 2000 NBA Draft
 Rowan Barrett, basketball player, top scorer in the 2002 Israel Basketball Premier League
 Frank Barsalona, music industry talent agent, non-performer inductee in Rock and Roll Hall of Fame
 Bruce R. Bent, inventor of first money market fund
 Walter Berry, NBA basketball player
 Anthony Joseph Bevilacqua, Cardinal and Archbishop of Philadelphia
 Alessandra Biaggi (born 1986), New York State Senator
 Albert H. Bosch, United States House of Representatives
 Leonard Boudin, lawyer and civil rights activist
 Harry Boykoff (1922–2001), NBA basketball player
 Keegan Bradley, professional golfer, winner of 2011 PGA Championship
 Adam Braz (born 1981), Canadian soccer player and Technical Director of the Montreal Impact of Major League Soccer
 Robert J. Brennan, Bishop of Brooklyn, previously Bishop of Columbus, Ohio, and auxiliary Bishop of Rockville Centre
 Ron Brown, US Secretary of Commerce
 Justin Brownlee, professional basketball player
 Danny Burawa (born 1988), Major League Baseball pitcher
 Gerald Calabrese, Mayor of Cliffside Park, New Jersey (1965–2015), NBA player with Syracuse Nationals (predecessor to Philadelphia 76ers)
 James P. Campbell, President and CEO of General Electric Consumer and Industrial
 Gerald Cardinale, New Jersey State Senator
 Hugh Carey, Governor of the State of New York and US Representative from Brooklyn
 Gregory W. Carman, United States House of Representatives
 Lou Carnesecca, Hall of Fame basketball coach, St. John's head coach for 24 seasons
 Tom Carr, Seattle City Attorney and Boulder City Attorney
 William J. Casey, Director of Central Intelligence Agency
 Ignatius Anthony Catanello (1938–2013), prelate of the Roman Catholic Church
 Alfred C. Cerullo III, New York City Commissioner and Council Member, professional actor in theater and television
 Carmen Beauchamp Ciparick, judge of New York State Court of Appeals
 Frank Cipolla, journalist
 Dane Clark, actor
 Akis Cleanthous (1964–2011), Cypriot Minister of Education and Culture (2007–2008)
 J. Cole, hip-hop recording artist and record producer
 William Colton, member of New York State Assembly
 John Corvino, professor of philosophy at Wayne State University
 Mario Cuomo, Governor of the State of New York, Lieutenant Governor, and Secretary of State
 Rachel Daly, professional footballer for England women's national football team and the US' NWSL's Houston Dash
 Nickolas Davatzes, former President and CEO of A&E Network
 Mack David (1912–1993), lyricist and songwriter
 Mel Davis, professional basketball player
 Raymond J. Dearie, US District Judge, Eastern District of New York
 George Deukmejian, Attorney General (1979–1982) and Governor of the State of California (1983–1990)
 Dominick L. DiCarlo, US Assistant Secretary of State for International Narcotics Matters, Chief Judge of the US Court of International Trade
 Janet DiFiore, Chief Judge, New York Court of Appeals
 Patricia DiMango, Justice, New York Supreme Court
 Richard Donoghue, US Attorney for the Eastern District of New York
 Tom J. Donohue, President and CEO of United States Chamber of Commerce
 Dan Donovan, United States House of Representatives, New York's 11th congressional district
 John Francis Dooling Jr., US District Judge, Eastern District of New York
 Conrad B. Duberstein (1915–2005), Chief Judge of US Bankruptcy Court for Eastern District of New York
 Clarence Dunnaville, lawyer and civil rights activist
 George Dzundza, actor
 Randall T. Eng, Presiding Justice, New York Supreme Court, Appellate Division
 John Louis Esposito, historian and orientalist
 Clare Farragher (born 1941), member of New Jersey General Assembly (1988–2002)
 Alexander A. Farrelly, Governor of US Virgin Islands
 Patricia Fili-Krushel, senior executive at NBC Universal News Group, Time Warner, WebMD, ABC Television Network
 Mickey Fisher (1904/05–1963), basketball coach
 Joseph C. H. Flynn (1892–1941), lawyer, politician, and magistrate
 Gardner Fox, comic book writer, creator of original Justice Society, The Flash; novelist
 Mike Francesa, radio personality, "The Sports Pope"
 John Franco, baseball player, captain for New York Mets
 Dan Frisa, United States House of Representatives
 Bill Gaudette, MLS professional soccer player
 Nelson George, author, columnist, filmmaker, music and culture critic, and journalist
 John J. Ghezzi, NYS Secretary of State
 Patricia Reilly Giff, author of children's books
 Jacob H. Gilbert (1920–1981), US Representative from New York between 1960 and 1971
 John Girgenti, New Jersey State Senator
 Hy Gotkin (1922–2004), basketball player
 Matt Groenwald, MLS professional soccer player
 Frank Gulotta, Nassau County District Attorney and NYS Appellate Division judge
 Dan Halloran, New York City Council member
 Zendon Hamilton, professional basketball player
 Craig Hansen, MLB professional baseball player
 Maurice Harkless, NBA player for Portland Trail Blazers
 Marcus Hatten (born 1980), basketball player, 2006 top scorer in the Israeli Basketball Premier League
 Richard Garth Henning, Auxiliary Bishop of Rockville Centre
 Darryl Hill, basketball player known as "Showtime Hill"
 Lester Holtzman, US Congressman and NY Judge
 Daryl Homer (born 1990), Olympic fencer
 George Hu, Taiwanese actor
 Charles Hynes, District Attorney of Kings County, Brooklyn
 Race Imboden, Olympic fencer for team USA
 Mark Jackson, NBA basketball player
 Harold M. Jacobs (1912–1995), Jewish and civic leader
 Mark Jacoby, Broadway actor
 Jaheim, R&B singer
 Theodore T. Jones Jr., Judge, New York Court of Appeals
 Shalrie Joseph, MLS professional soccer player
 Agim Kaba, actor, artist
 Alex Katz (born 1994), baseball player
 Melinda Katz, Queens Borough President
 Margaret M. Keane, Chief Executive Officer and President of Synchrony Financial
 Raymond W. Kelly, Commissioner of New York City Police Department
 D.J. Kennedy (born 1989), NBA basketball player
 John M. Kennedy, Jr., politician from Suffolk County, New York
 Brian Kenny, ESPN sportscaster
 Lawrence Korb, US Assistant Secretary of Defense (1981–1985)
 Boris Kostelanetz (1911–2006), tax lawyer
 John Kresse, NCAA men's basketball coach at College of Charleston
 Andrew Lanza, New York State Senator
 Henry J. Latham, United States House of Representatives
 Peter Le Jacq, a Maryknoll priest
 Raymond Lesniak, New Jersey State Senator
 Andrew Levane, NBA basketball player
 Stanley David Levison, lawyer, activist and advisor to Rev. Dr. Martin Luther King Jr.
 Steve Levy, 7th County Executive of Suffolk County
 Mark LoMonaco, professional wrestler
 Annet Mahendru (born 1985), Afghan-born American actress of Indian-Russian descent
 Patrick A. Malone, Chief Supervisory Officer of Garden State Securities Inc.
 Guy James Mangano, Presiding Justice of New York Supreme Court, Appellate Division
 Thomas J. Manton, US Congressman and Chair of Queens County Democratic Organization
 John J. Marchi (1921–2009), New York State Senator (1957–2007)
 Mariah the Scientist (born Mariah Amani Buckles, 1997), singer-songwriter
 Jack Martins, NYS Senator
 John McCormac, Mayor of Woodbridge Township, New Jersey
 Darryl "D.M.C." McDaniels, co-founder of hip-hop group Run-D.M.C.
 Al McGuire, NCAA basketball coach and television commentator
 Ed McGuire, assistant general manager and Executive VP of Football Operations San Diego Chargers
 Frank McGuire, NCAA basketball coach at St. John's, North and South Carolina and NBA coach for Philadelphia Warriors
 Brian McNamee, MLB conditioning coach
 Stefani Miglioranzi, soccer player for Los Angeles Galaxy, played in England for Swindon Town
 Charles Minlend, professional basketball player, 2003 Israeli Basketball Premier League MVP
 Michael Montesano, member of New York State Assembly
 Chris Mullin, NBA player, Hall of Famer, head coach of St. John's Red Storm
 Sam Nahem (1915–2004), Major League Baseball pitcher
 Kate O'Beirne, journalist, political commentator, magazine editor
 Paul O'Dwyer, President of the New York City Council (1974–1977)
 Diarmuid F. O'Scannlain, Judge, US Court of Appeals for the Ninth Circuit
 Joe Panik, professional baseball player for San Francisco Giants
 Basil Paterson, New York Secretary of State, NY State Senator, attorney
 Edmund D. Pellegrino, 11th President of The Catholic University of America
 James Pitaro, President of ESPN and Co-Chair, Disney Media Networks
 Harvey Pitt, 26th Chairman of US Securities and Exchange Commission (2001–2003)
 Richie Powers, NBA referee (1956–1979)
 Charles B. Rangel, US Representative of Manhattan
 Lewis Ranieri, former bond trader and "father" of mortgage-backed securities.
 Edward D. Re, Chief Judge of US Court of International Trade and US Assistant Secretary of State for Educational and Cultural Affairs
 Mike Repole, Co-Founder of Glaceau, BODYARMOR SuperDrink and Repole Stables
 Victor Ricciardi, professor of business
 Wayne Rosenthal (born 1965), Major League Baseball pitcher and coach
 Christopher Ruddy, CEO of Newsmax Media
 Mickey Rutner, Major League Baseball player
 Luke Sabis, musician, film director and actor
 Brent Sancho, MLS professional soccer player
 Metta Sandiford-Artest (born 1979), NBA basketball player formerly known as Metta World Peace and Ron Artest
 John J. Santucci, District Attorney of Queens
 Diane Savino, New York State Senator
 Eli Schenkel (born 1992), Canadian Olympic fencer
 James J. Schiro (1946–2014), CEO of PriceWaterhouseCoopers and Zurich Financial Services
 Ian Schrager, hotelier and real estate developer
 Howie Schwab, eponymous star of ESPN's show Stump the Schwab
 Malik Sealy, NBA basketball player
 Joanna Seybert, US District Judge, Eastern District of New York
 Sidney Shapiro (1915–2014), American-born Chinese translator, actor and author
 Bob Sheppard, announcer for New York Yankees, "Voice of the Yankees"
 David D. Siegel, law professor, legal scholar and commentator
 Ron Silver (1946–2009), Tony Award-winning actor
 Keeth Smart, Olympic fencer, first US fencer to reach #1 world ranking
 Kathryn Smith, first full-time female National Football League coach
 John E. Sprizzo, US District Judge, Southern District of New York
 Stuart Sternberg, financier and principal shareholder and Managing General Partner of the Tampa Bay Rays baseball team
 Elaine Weddington Steward, lawyer working for Major League Baseball
 Norman Sturner (born 1940), real estate developer
 Bruce Sudano, singer-songwriter, record producer and music arranger
 Kevin J. Sweeney, Bishop of Paterson, New Jersey
 Tan Xiangdong, also known as Adam Tan, co-founder of Hainan Airlines and former CEO of HNA Group
 Fred Thompson (1933–2019), Hall of Fame track and field coach
 Matthew Titone, member of New York State Assembly
 Peter J. Tobin, Chief Financial Officer of Chase Manhattan Corporation
 Michael Tucci, actor
 Bob Turner, US Representative for the 9th Congressional District of New York (2011–2013)
 Martin Tytell (1913–2008), expert in manual typewriters
 Larry Valencia, Rhode Island State Representative
 Daphne Valerius, filmmaker
 Paul Vallone, New York City Council member
 Jimmy Van Bramer, New York City Council member
 Anthony Varvaro (1984–2022), MLB pitcher and Port Authority police officer
 Richard Vetere, playwright and screenwriter
 Karina Vetrano, murder victim
 Frank Viola, professional baseball player
 Sal Vulcano, comedian, Impractical Jokers
 Cora Walker, one of the first black women to practice law in New York
 Bill Wennington, NBA basketball player and author
 Jayson Williams, NBA basketball player and author
 Kevin Williams (basketball), retired NBA basketball player
 Chris Wingert, MLS professional soccer player
 Terence Winter, writer, TV, and film producer, creator of HBO series Boardwalk Empire
 Dagmara Wozniak (born 1988), Olympic saber fencer
 Emanuel Xavier, poet and LGBTQ+ activist
 Max Zaslofsky (1925–1985), NBA guard/forward, All-Star, ABA coach
 DJ Zeke, professional DJ

Fictional 
 Ray Barone, title character of TV series Everybody Loves Raymond
 Michael Clayton, title character of 2007 film Michael Clayton
 Shawn Stark, a main character of TV series Power, who fictionally played for St. John's Basketball

References